Reinaldo Manoel da Silva (born 28 September 1989), simply known as Reinaldo, is a Brazilian professional footballer who plays as a left-back for Grêmio.

Club career

Born in Porto Calvo, Alagoas, Reinaldo played for São Paulo state lowly sides, notably at Paulista FC. On 16 May 2012 he joined Série A side Sport Recife until the end of the season, on loan from Penapolense.

Reinaldo made his top flight debut on 27 May, coming on as a late substitute in a 0–0 draw at Santos FC. He finished the season with 24 appearances (18 starts, 1696 minutes of action), but experiencing relegation nonetheless.

On 29 May 2013 Reinaldo joined São Paulo FC also on loan. On 30 November, after featuring regularly for the side, Tricolor bought him outright.

On 8 February 2016, Reinaldo was loaned to Ponte Preta until the end of the year. On 28 December, he renewed his contract until 2018 and moved to Chapecoense also in a temporary deal.

Career statistics

Honours
Penapolense
Campeonato Paulista Série A3: 2011
Copa Paulista: 2011

São Paulo
Campeonato Paulista: 2021

Chapecoense
 Campeonato Catarinense: 2017

References

External links
São Paulo official profile 

1989 births
Living people
Brazilian footballers
Association football defenders
Campeonato Brasileiro Série A players
Campeonato Brasileiro Série B players
Clube Atlético Penapolense players
Paulista Futebol Clube players
Sport Club do Recife players
São Paulo FC players
Associação Atlética Ponte Preta players
Associação Chapecoense de Futebol players
Sportspeople from Alagoas